Panthère Sportive du Ndé FC is a football club based in Bangangté, Cameroon. It is a member of the Cameroonian Football Federation.

Honours
Cameroon Cup
 Winners (2): 1988, 2009

West Division Two Championship
 Winners (1): 2006

Performance in CAF competitions
CAF Confederation Cup: 3 appearances
2010: First Round
2013: First Round
2015: Preliminary Round

CAF Cup Winners' Cup: 1 appearance
1989: First Round

Presidents
 Célestine Ketcha Courtès

References

Panthere de Bangangte
1952 establishments in French Cameroon
Sports clubs in Cameroon